Egoitz García Echeguibel (born 31 March 1986) is a Spanish professional road bicycle racer who last rode for UCI Continental team . He formerly rode for UCI Professional Continental Team .

Born in Barakaldo, García has competed as a professional since the start of the 2010 season, riding as a member of the  squad for two seasons before joining  for the 2012 season. In August 2012, García took his first victory for the team, by winning the two-stage Paris–Corrèze race in France; having finished with the peloton in stage one, García finished second to 's Kenny Elissonde on the final stage, after the pair had broken away from the main field. In December 2014 it was announced that García would join the new Basque-based  team for 2015.

Career achievements

Major results

2004
3rd National Junior Time Trial Championships
2007
1st Stage 1 Vuelta Ciclista a Valladolid
2009
1st GP Macario
2010
7th Gran Premio de Llodio
2011
7th Overall Tour of Turkey
8th Cholet-Pays de Loire
2012
1st Overall Paris–Corrèze
2013
3rd Circuito de Getxo
4th Trofeo Campos–Santanyí–Ses Salines
4th Trofeo Platja de Muro
7th Overall Tour du Haut Var
10th Omloop Het Nieuwsblad
10th Prueba Villafranca de Ordizia
2014
3rd Overall La Tropicale Amissa Bongo
9th Omloop Het Nieuwsblad
2015
7th National Road Race Championships
9th Circuito de Getxo

Grand Tour general classification results timeline

References

External links
Cofidis profile

Cycling Quotient profile

Spanish male cyclists
1986 births
Living people
Sportspeople from Barakaldo
Cyclists from the Basque Country (autonomous community)